John Christopher O'Connor (December 21, 1878 – January 5, 1922) was an American football player, coach, and physician.  He served as the head football coach at Bowdoin College from 1902 to 1903, at Virginia Agricultural and Mechanical College and Polytechnic Institute (VPI)—now known as Virginia Tech—in 1904, and at Dartmouth College from 1907 to 1908, compiling a career college football record of 26–14–2.  O'Connor played football at Dartmouth from 1898 to 1901, and captained the team in 1901.

O'Connor was born in Bradford, Massachusetts on December 21, 1878.  He graduated from Haverhill High School in 1898, Dartmouth College in 1902, and the Bowdoin Medical School in 1905.  O'Connor served on the staff of the Eliot and Balch hospitals in Manchester, New Hampshire.  He died there on January 5, 1922.

Head coaching record

References

External links
 

1878 births
1922 deaths
19th-century players of American football
Bowdoin Polar Bears football coaches
Dartmouth Big Green football coaches
Dartmouth Big Green football players
Virginia Tech Hokies football coaches
Medical School of Maine alumni
People from Bradford, Massachusetts
Sportspeople from Haverhill, Massachusetts
Coaches of American football from Massachusetts
Players of American football from Massachusetts
Physicians from New Hampshire